Gymnoscelis birivulata is a moth in the family Geometridae. It is found in Kenya and on São Tomé.

References

Moths described in 1902
Gymnoscelis
Moths of Africa
Moths of São Tomé and Príncipe